''Astatotilapia'' sp. 'dwarf bigeye scraper' is a putative, undescribed species of fish in the family Cichlidae. It is endemic to Kenya.  It was listed as critically endangered in the 1996-2006 IUCN Red List of Threatened Species, but not mentioned in the most recent versions.

References

Astatotilapia
Undescribed vertebrate species
Endemic freshwater fish of Kenya
Cichlid fish of Africa
Taxonomy articles created by Polbot